Hiralal Yadav (1925/1926 – 12 May 2019) was an Indian folk singer, who was awarded the Padma Shri, the fourth highest civilian award in India in 2019. He was awarded the Yash Bharti Award in 2015.

Discography

Selected albums

Honours 
 Padma Shri in 2019 from the Government of India
 Yash Bharti Award in 2015 from the Government of Uttar Pradesh
 Tagore Akademi Award in 2011 from the Sangeet Natak Akademi
 Sangeet Natak Akademi Award in 1993-94 from the Sangeet Natak Akademi

Death 
At the age of 93, he died on 12 May 2019. PM Narendra Modi paid homage to Hiralal Yadav.

On 14 May 2019, Chief Minister Yogi Adityanath met his family and paid condolence to the family members.

See also 

 List of Padma Shri award recipients (2010–2019)

References

External links 
 
 Heera Lal Yadav's Discography

21st-century Indian male singers
21st-century Indian singers
Recipients of the Padma Shri in arts
1920s births
2019 deaths
20th-century Indian male singers
20th-century Indian singers
People from Uttar Pradesh